Jonathan Erlich and Andy Ram were the defending champions, but lost in the quarterfinals to Vince Spadea and Fernando Verdasco.

Sanchai Ratiwatana and Sonchat Ratiwatana won in the final 3–6, 7–5, [10–7], against Michaël Llodra and Nicolas Mahut.

Seeds

Draw

Draw

External links
Draw

Doubles